The strongest locally convex topological vector space (TVS) topology on  the tensor product of two locally convex TVSs, making the canonical map  (defined by sending  to ) continuous is called the projective topology or the π-topology.

Preliminaries 

Throughout let  and  be topological vector spaces and  be a linear map.

 If  is a subspace of  then both the quotient map  and the canonical injection  are homomorphisms. In particular, any linear map  can be canonically decomposed as follows:  where  defines a bijection. 
 A linear map  from a Hilbert space into itself is called positive if  for every  In this case, there is a unique positive map  called the square-root of  such that  
 If  is any continuous linear map between Hilbert spaces, then  is always positive.
 A linear map  is called compact or completely continuous if there is a neighborhood  of the origin in  such that  is precompact in 
 In a Hilbert space, positive compact linear operators, say  have a simple spectral decomposition discovered at the beginning of the 20th century by Fredholm and F. Riesz: 

Notation for topologies 

 As usual, if  is considered as a topological vector space but it has not been made clear what topology it is endowed with, then the topology will be assumed to be

A canonical tensor product as a subspace of the dual of Bi(X, Y) 

This induces a canonical map  defined by  where  denotes the algebraic dual of   

 Tensor product of seminorms 

Throughout we will let  and  be locally convex topological vector spaces (local convexity allows us to define useful topologies). 
If  is a seminorm on  then  will be its closed unit ball.

where  is the balanced convex hull of  
Given  in  this can also be expressed as

If  then we have

 Universal property 

 The π-topology 

Note that the canonical vector space isomorphism  preserves equicontinuous subsets.

 Preserved properties 

Let  and  be locally convex TVSs. 

 Completion 

However,  can always be linearly embedded as a dense vector subspace of some complete locally convex TVS, which is generally denoted by  via a linear topological embedding. Using this map,  is identified as a subspace of 

 Grothendieck's representation of elements of  

The following fundamental result in the theory of topological tensor products is due to Alexander Grothendieck.

The next theorem shows that it is possible to make the representation of  independent of the sequences  and 

 Topology of bi-bounded convergence 

This question is equivalent to the questions: Given a bounded subset  do there exist bounded subsets  and  such that  is a subset of the closed convex hull of ?

They are also equal when both spaces are Fréchet with one of them being nuclear.

 Strong dual and bidual 

Given a locally convex TVS   is assumed to have the strong topology (so ) and unless stated otherwise, the same is true of the bidual  (so  Alexander Grothendieck characterized the strong dual and bidual for certain situations:

 Properties 

  has a unique continuous extension to  denoted by  
 If all four spaces are normed then  
 The π-topology is finer than the ε-topology (since the canonical bilinear map  is continuous).

 Projective norm 

Then  is a normable space with a canonical norm denoted by  

where  is the balanced convex hull of  
Given  in  this can also be expressed as

If  is in  then
 
 
 

 Properties 

 For all normed spaces  the canonical vector space isomorphism of  onto  is an isometry.

 Preserved properties 

 In general, the projective tensor product does not respect subspaces (e.g. if  is a vector subspace of  then the TVS  has in general a coarser topology than the subspace topology inherited from ). 
 If  is an isometric embedding into a Banach space  then its unique continuous extension  is also an isometric embedding. 
 Let  and  be vector subspaces of the Banach spaces  and  respectively.

 Trace form 

Suppose that  is a locally convex spaces. Letting  have its strong dual topology, we can continuously extend this linear map to a map  (assuming that the vector spaces have scalar field ) called the trace of  
This name originates from the fact that if we write  where  if  and 0 otherwise, then 

 Duality with L(X; Y') 

 
defined by 
 
where  is the identity map and 
 
is the unique continuous extension of the continuous map 
 

 Nuclear operators 

There is a canonical vector space embedding  defined by sending  to the map

where it can be shown that this value is independent of the representation of  chosen.

 Nuclear operators between Banach spaces 

 Nuclear operators between locally convex spaces 

Let  and let  be the canonical projection.
Given any continuous linear map  one obtains through composition the continuous linear map ; thus we have an injection  and we henceforth use this map to identify  as a subspace of 

Let  and  be Hausdorff locally convex spaces.

Nuclear operators between Hilbert spaces 

Every nuclear operator is an integral operator but the converse is not necessarily true. However, every integral operator between Hilbert spaces is nuclear.

Nuclear bilinear forms 

There is a canonical vector space embedding  defined by sending  to the map

where it can be shown that this value is independent of the representation of  chosen.

Nuclear bilinear forms on Banach spaces 

 The following are equivalent:
  is nuclear.
 In this case we call  a nuclear representation of 

Note that

Examples

Space of absolutely summable families 

Throughout this section we fix some arbitrary (possibly uncountable) set  a TVS  and we let  be the directed set of all finite subsets of  directed by inclusion 

We call  absolutely summable if it is summable and if for every continuous seminorm  on  the family  is summable in  The set of all such absolutely summable families is a vector subspace of  denoted by 

Note that if  is a metrizable locally convex space then at most countably many terms in an absolutely summable family are non-0.  
A metrizable locally convex space is nuclear if and only if every summable sequence is absolutely summable. It follows that a normable space in which every summable sequence is absolutely summable, is necessarily finite dimensional.

This is a common occurrence when studying the injective and projective tensor products of function/sequence spaces and TVSs: the "natural way" in which one would define (from scratch) a topology on such a tensor product is frequently equivalent to the projective or injective tensor product topology.

For any such  and any  let  where  defines a seminorm on  The family of seminorms  generates a topology making  into a locally convex space. The vector space  endowed with this topology will be denoted by  The special case where  is the scalar field will be denoted by 

There is a canonical embedding of vector spaces  defined by linearizing the bilinear map  defined by

See also

References

Bibliography

External links 

 Nuclear space at ncatlab

Functional analysis
Topological tensor products